Jaan Valsiner (born June 29, 1951 in Tallinn, Estonia) is an Estonian-American professor of developmental and cultural psychology, the recipient of Alexander von Humboldt Prize (1995) for his interdisciplinary
work on human development and 2017 Hans-Kilian-Award winner, the Foreign Member of the Estonian Academy of Sciences and the former Niels Bohr Professor of Cultural Psychology (in 2013-2018), currently, a professor at Aalborg University, Denmark.

Life 
Jaan Valsiner worked as a professor of psychology in Clark University in Worcester, Massachusetts from 1997. Between 2013 and 2018, Valsiner was a Niels Bohr Professor, since then a professor at Aalborg University in Denmark.

His early studies were in the field of developmental psychology, specifically in the analysis of mother-child interaction patterns and ever since he identifies himself as "cultural psychologist with a consistently developmental axiomatic base". His later studies and research focus gradually shifted into cultural psychology and cultural organization of human cognitive and affective processes throughout life-span. He has also considerably contributed to the fields of the history of psychology as well as methodology of psychological research. His other major research interest is the intersection of and interconnections between psychology and semiotics.

He has been a visiting professor in Brazil, Japan, Australia, Estonia. Germany, Italy, Luxembourg, United Kingdom, and the Netherlands.
On February 22, 2008 he was announced an Honourable Doctor of the Tallinn University.

Jaan Valsiner is the editor-in-chief of Culture and Psychology (SAGE Publishing; as a founding editor in 1995 and until now), Integrative Psychological and Behavioral Science (Springer Publishing, from 2007), and of  The Oxford Handbook of Culture and Psychology (Oxford University Press, 2012). He is also the editor of several book series, such as Advances in Cultural Psychology and Annals of Cultural Psychology' '' with Information Age Publishing (IAP), Charlotte, North Carolina, USA; History and Theory of Psychology with Transaction Publishers, USA (sold to Taylor & Francis in 2016 and merged with its Routledge imprint); Cultural Dynamics of Social Representation with Routledge in UK; and one of the founding editors of the IAP Yearbook of Idiographic Science'' (since 2008)

Awards 
 1995 – Alexander von Humboldt Award for research in social sciences
 1995–1997 – Senior Fulbright Lecturing Award in Brazil
 2001 – 4th Class Order of the White Star
 2008 – Honourable doctorate at the Tallinn University
 2010 – Honourable doctorate at the University of Valle, Colombia
 2017 – Hans-Kilian-Award
 2017 – the Foreign Member of the Estonian Academy of Sciences

Selected works 
 1987 – Culture and the development of children's action (2nd ed. in 1997). Chichester: Wiley.
 1988 - Developmental Psychology in the Soviet Union. Bloomington: Indiana University Press. 
 1991 – Understanding Vygotsky. A quest for synthesis, with René van der Veer. Malden: Blackwell Publishing. 
 1994 - The Vygotsky Reader, with René van der Veer. Oxford, UK: Wiley-Blackwell.
 1998 – The Guided Mind. Cambridge: Harvard University Press.
 2000 – The social mind: Construction of the idea. With R. van der Veer. New York: Cambridge University Press.
 2007 - The Cambridge Handbook of Socio-Cultural Psychology, with Alberto Rosa.
 2007 – Culture in minds and societies. New Delhi: Sage.
 2012 - A Guided Science: History of Psychology in the Mirror of Its Making. Transaction Publishers/Routledge.
 2014 - Invitation to Cultural Psychology. London: Sage.
 2017 - From Methodology to Methods in Human Psychology. Springer VS. SpringerBriefs in Psychology.

References

External links 
 Jaan Valsiner at Clark University
 Jaan Valsiner at Aalborg University
 Valsiner's personal web site
 Jaan Valsiner on amazon.com

1951 births
Academic staff of Aalborg University
Academic journal editors
Clark University faculty
Communication theorists
Cultural psychologists
American developmental psychologists
Estonian psychologists
Humboldt Research Award recipients
Living people
Members of the Estonian Academy of Sciences
People from Tallinn
Recipients of the Order of the White Star, 4th Class
Tallinn University alumni
University of Tartu alumni
American cognitive scientists